Simon Atkins may refer to:
Simon Atkins (footballer) (born 1968), Australian rules football player
Simon Atkins (basketball) (born 1988), Filipino basketball player
Simon Atkins, runner up in the Irish reality television show Total Xposure
Simon Green Atkins (1863–1934), North Carolina educator